Claudia Barth (born 28 January 1975) is a former German  rower. She competed in the women's coxless pair event at the 2000 Summer Olympics.

References

External links
 

1975 births
Living people
German female rowers
Olympic rowers of Germany
Sportspeople from Ulm
Rowers at the 2000 Summer Olympics